Hatice Yıldız Levent, better known by her stage name Muazzez Ersoy, (born 9 August 1958) is a Turkish classical music singer. In 1998, with the suggestion of the 33rd government of Turkey's Ministry of Culture, she was chosen as a State Artist. Due to singing nostalgic songs, she is also known with the title "Nostalgia Queen" inside Turkey. In 2006, she was chosen as a goodwill ambassador for United Nations High Commissioner for Refugees.

Ersoy spent her childhood and early adulthood in Kasımpaşa, Beyoğlu. She became initially interested in music due to her mother's affinity for music. This passion of her mother influenced Ersoy during her youth, and after finishing secondary school, she decided to continue her studies by taking music lessons. She took lessons from music teachers such as İrfan Özbakır and Baki Duyarlar. She did a «clerkship» and spent her savings on music lessons.

Ersoy, who achieved great sales with her nostalgia album series, recently rerecorded the pop songs that were released in the 90s. In the album titled “90’dan POP”, Ersoy performed the songs of Tarkan, Sezen Aksu, Serdar Ortaç, Yıldız Tilbe, Harun Kolçak, Eda and Metin Özülkü, and released the first music video of the album for Serdar Ortaç's song "Değmez".

She also hosted the TV program "Yıldız Akşamı" on TRT Müzik.

Discography

Studio albums

Singles

Notes

External links 
 
 Sozmuzik.com - Biography of Muazzez Ersoy 

1958 births
Turkish women singers
Turkish classical singers
State Artists of Turkey
United Nations High Commissioner for Refugees Goodwill Ambassadors
Living people
Singers from Istanbul